

The Frederick Turner Fourplex is a historic apartment building located in Portland, Oregon, United States. Built in 1928 in the Tudor Revival style, it is an outstanding example of Portland architect Roscoe D. Hemenway's (1889–1959) work in period revival styles during the 1920s through the 1950s. Hemenway was well known for designing well-appointed single-family homes, and the Turner Fourplex is one of very few multi-unit residences he produced.

The building was entered on the National Register of Historic Places in 1992.

Notes

See also
National Register of Historic Places listings in Northeast Portland, Oregon

References

External links

Oregon Historic Sites Database entry

1928 establishments in Oregon
Apartment buildings on the National Register of Historic Places in Portland, Oregon
Portland Historic Landmarks
Residential buildings completed in 1928
Sullivan's Gulch, Portland, Oregon
Tudor Revival architecture in Oregon